This is a list of American electoral candidates for the offices of President of the United States and Vice President of the United States of the modern Democratic Party, either duly preselected and nominated, or the presumptive nominees of a future preselection and election. Opponents who received over one percent of the popular vote or ran an official campaign that received Electoral College votes are listed. Offices held prior to Election Day are included, and those held on Election Day have an italicized end date.

19th century

1828, 1832

1836, 1840

1844

1848

1852

1856

1860

1864

1868

1872

1876

1880

1884, 1888, 1892

1896, 1900

20th century

1904

1908

1912, 1916

1920

1924

1928

1932, 1936, 1940, 1944

1948

1952, 1956

1960

1964

1968

1972

1976, 1980

1984

1988

1992, 1996

21st century

2000

2004

2008, 2012

2016

2020

See also
List of Democratic National Conventions
History of the United States Democratic Party
List of United States National Republican/Whig Party presidential tickets
List of United States Republican Party presidential tickets
List of United States Green Party presidential tickets
List of United States Libertarian Party presidential tickets
List of Federalist Party presidential tickets
List of Democratic-Republican Party presidential tickets
List of United States major third party and independent presidential tickets
List of United States Democratic Party presidential candidates

Notes

 
 
Democrats
Presidential tickets